2002 in sports describes the year's events in world sport.

Alpine skiing
 Alpine Skiing World Cup
 Women's overall season champion: Michaela Dorfmeister, Austria

American football
 Super Bowl XXXVI – the New England Patriots (AFC) won 20–17 over the heavily favored St. Louis Rams (NFC)
Location: Superdome
Attendance: 72,922
MVP: Tom Brady, QB (New England)
 Rose Bowl (2001 season):
 The Miami Hurricanes won 37–14 over the Nebraska Cornhuskers to win the college football national championship
 ArenaBowl XVI – San Jose SaberCats win 52–14 over the Arizona Rattlers
 The Houston Texans become the NFL's 32nd active franchise.

Association football
 2002 FIFA World Cup is held from May 31 to June 30 in South Korea and Japan, the first time a World Cup is held in Asia and by two countries simultaneously. Brazil wins its fifth title, defeating Germany 2–0 in the final. Surprisingly, Turkey and host nation South Korea take 3rd and 4th.
 Champions' League – Real Madrid beats Bayer Leverkusen 2–1 in the final. This was Real Madrid's 9th European Cup.
 UEFA Cup – Feyenoord wins 3–2 in the final against Borussia Dortmund, winning the cup for the second time.
 European Super Cup – Real Madrid wins 3–1 over Feyenoord, winning the cup for the first time.
 Intercontinental Cup – Real Madrid beats Olimpia Asunción 2–0, winning the cup for the third time.

Athletics
 July – 2002 Commonwealth Games held in Manchester
 August – 2002 European Championships in Athletics held in Munich
 October – 2002 Asian Games held in Busan, South Korea

Australian rules football
 Australian Football League
 The Brisbane Lions win the 106th AFL premiership (Brisbane Lions 10.15 (75) d Collingwood 9.12 (66))
 Brownlow Medal awarded to Simon Black (Brisbane Lions)
 See also Australian Football League season 2002
 Inaugural Australian Football International Cup, the 2002 International Cup won by Ireland

Baseball
 World Series – Anaheim Angels win 4 games to 3 over the San Francisco Giants

Basketball
 NBA Finals –
 Los Angeles Lakers sweep the New Jersey Nets to win their third straight NBA title. Shaquille O'Neal wins his third straight NBA Finals MVP award, and coach Phil Jackson wins his ninth title, and his third three-peat.
 NBA's Charlotte Hornets moved to New Orleans.
 NCAA Men's Basketball Championship –
 Maryland Terrapins win 64–52 over the Indiana Hoosiers
 WNBA finals
 Los Angeles Sparks win 2 games to 0 over the New York Liberty
 FIBA World Championship won by Yugoslavia
 FIBA World Championship for Women won by USA
 Chinese Basketball Association finals:
 Yao Ming and his Shanghai Sharks teammates defeat Bayi Rockets, 3 games to 1, snapping a string of six consecutive Bayi championships.
 National Basketball League (Australia) Finals:
 Adelaide 36ers defeated the West Sydney Razorbacks 2–1 in the best-of-three final series.
 October 5 – University Athletic Association of the Philippines men's division finals: The Ateneo Blue Eagles defeat the De La Salle Green Archers to end their 4-year title streak and win the school their first title in 14 years.

Boxing
 June 21 – Lennox Lewis retains boxing's WBC world Heavyweight crown with an eight-round knockout over Mike Tyson
 April – The Ring Magazine released its new championship policy, "The Ring's Championship Policy"
 July 12 to July 21 – 34th European Amateur Boxing Championships held in Perm, Russia

Canadian football
 November 23 – Saint Mary's Huskies win the Vanier Cup game, defeating the Saskatchewan Huskies 39–23.
 November 24 – the Montreal Alouettes win the 90th Grey Cup game, defeating the Edmonton Eskimos 25–16 at Commonwealth Stadium in Edmonton.

Cricket
 March 23 – death of Ben Hollioake, Surrey and England player, in a car crash
 June 1 – death of Hansie Cronje, South African player still involved in match-fixing controversy, in an air crash
 New Zealand are forced to abandon their tour of Pakistan after a bomb explodes outside their hotel in Karachi
 County Championship (England and Wales) – Surrey CCC

Cycle racing
Road bicycle racing
 Giro d'Italia won by Paolo Savoldelli of Italy
 Tour de France – Lance Armstrong of the United States (Rescinded)
 UCI Road World Championships – Men's road race – Mario Cipollini, of Italy
Cyclo-cross
 2–3 February – UCI Cyclo-cross World Championships held in Zolder, Belgium
 men's competition won by Mario De Clercq
 women's competition won by Laurence Leboucher

Dogsled racing
 Iditarod Trail Sled Dog Race Champion
 Martin Buser wins with lead dog Bronson

Field hockey
 2002 Men's Hockey World Cup: Germany
 2002 Women's Hockey World Cup: Argentina
 Men's Hockey at the 2002 Commonwealth Games: Australia
 Hockey at the 2002 Commonwealth Games – Women's tournament: India
 Men's Champions Trophy: Netherlands
 Women's Champions Trophy: China

Figure skating
 World Figure Skating Championships –
 Men's champion: Alexei Yagudin, Russia
 Ladies' champion: Irina Slutskaya, Russia
 Pair skating champions: Shen Xue & Zhao Hongbo, China
 Ice dancing champions: Irina Lobacheva & Ilia Averbukh, Russia
 2002 Winter Olympics –
 Men's champion: Alexei Yagudin, Russia
 Ladies' champion: Sarah Hughes, United States
 Pair skating champions: Yelena Berezhnaya & Anton Sikharulidze, Russia and Jamie Salé & David Pelletier, Canada
 Ice dancing champions: Marina Anissina & Gwendal Peizerat, France

Floorball 
 Men's World Floorball Championships
 Champion: Sweden
 European Cup
 Men's champion: Haninge IBK
 Women's champion: Balrog IK

Gaelic Athletic Association
Camogie
 All-Ireland Camogie Champion: Cork
 National Camogie League: Galway
Gaelic football
 All-Ireland Senior Football Championship – Armagh 1-12 died Kerry 0-14
 National Football League – Tyrone 0-15 died Cavan 0-7
Ladies' Gaelic football
 All-Ireland Senior Football Champion: Mayo
 National Football League: Waterford
Hurling
 All-Ireland Senior Hurling Championship – Kilkenny 2-20 died Clare 0-19
 National Hurling League – Kilkenny 2–15 beat Cork 2–14

Golf
Men's professional
 – Masters Tournament – Tiger Woods becomes the third golfer to win The Masters in two consecutive years
 – U.S. Open – Tiger Woods is the only golfer under par for the tournament.
 – British Open – Ernie Els wins his third major and first British Open.
 – PGA Championship – Rich Beem wins by one shot over Tiger Woods.
 PGA Tour money leader – Tiger Woods – $6,912,625
 PGA Tour Player of the Year – Tiger Woods
 PGA Tour rookie of the year – Jonathan Byrd
 Senior PGA Tour money leader – Hale Irwin – $3,028,304
 Ryder Cup – Europe defeats the United States 15.5-12.5.
Men's amateur
 British Amateur – Alejandro Larrazabal
 U.S. Amateur – Ricky Barnes
 European Amateur – Raphaël Pellicioli
Women's professional
 Nabisco Championship – Annika Sörenstam
 LPGA Championship – Se Ri Pak
 U.S. Women's Open – Juli Inkster
 Women's British Open – Karrie Webb
 LPGA Tour money leader – Annika Sörenstam – $2,863,904
 LPGA Tour Player of the Year – Annika Sörenstam
 The United States team defeats the European team 15 ½ – 12 ½ to regain the Solheim Cup.

Handball
 Men's European Championship: Sweden
 Women's European Championship: Denmark
 Asian Games (Men): Korea
 Asian Games (Women): Korea

Harness racing
 North America Cup – Red River Hanover
 United States Pacing Triple Crown races –
 Cane Pace won by Art Major
 Little Brown Jug won by Million Dollar Cam
 Messenger Stakes won by Allamerican Ingot
 United States Trotting Triple Crown races –
 Hambletonian won by Chip Chip Hooray
 Yonkers Trot won by Bubba Dunn
 Kentucky Futurity won by Like a Prayer

Horse racing
Steeplechases
 Cheltenham Gold Cup – Best Mate
 Grand National – Bindaree
Hurdle races
 Champion Hurdle – Hors La Loi III
Flat races
 Australia – Melbourne Cup won by Media Puzzle
 Canada – Queen's Plate won by T J's Lucky Moon
 Dubai – Dubai World Cup won by Street Cry	
 France – Prix de l'Arc de Triomphe won by Marienbard
 Ireland – Irish Derby Stakes won by High Chaparral
 Japan – Japan Cup won by Falbrav
 English Triple Crown Races:
 2,000 Guineas Stakes – Rock of Gibraltar
 The Derby – High Chaparral
 St. Leger Stakes – Bollin Eric
 United States Triple Crown Races:
 Kentucky Derby – War Emblem
 Preakness Stakes – War Emblem
 Belmont Stakes – Sarava
 Breeders' Cup World Thoroughbred Championships:
 Breeders' Cup Classic – Volponi
 Breeders' Cup Distaff – Azeri
 Breeders' Cup Filly & Mare Turf – Starine
 Breeders' Cup Juvenile – Vindication
 Breeders' Cup Juvenile Fillies – Storm Flag Flying
 Breeders' Cup Mile – Domedriver
 Breeders' Cup Sprint – Orientate
 Breeders' Cup Turf – High Chaparral

Ice hockey
 Canada defeats the United States 5–2 to win the men's Olympic Gold Medal.
 Canada defeats the United States 3–2 to win the women's Olympic Gold Medal.
 World Hockey Championship
 Men's champion: Slovakia defeats Russia.
 Junior Men's champion: Russia defeats Canada.
 Women's champion: no tournament.
 Stanley Cup – Detroit Red Wings win 4 games to 1 over the Carolina Hurricanes.
 Art Ross Trophy as the NHL's leading scorer during the regular season: Jarome Iginla, Calgary Flames.
 Hart Memorial Trophy for the NHL's Most Valuable Player:
 José Théodore, Montreal Canadiens.

Lacrosse
 The Baltimore Bayhawks win the Steinfeld Cup over the Long Island Lizards.
 The Toronto Rock beat the Albany Attack, 13–12 to win the Champion's Cup.
 The 9th World Lacrosse Championship is held in Perth, Australia. The United States beat Canada 18–15 in the final.
 The Coquitlam Adanacs win the Mann Cup.
 The St. Catharines Athletics win the Minto Cup.
 The Wallaceburg Red Devils win the Founders Cup.

Mixed martial arts
The following is a list of major noteworthy MMA events during 2002 in chronological order.

|-
|align=center style="border-style: none none solid solid; background: #e3e3e3"|Date
|align=center style="border-style: none none solid solid; background: #e3e3e3"|Event
|align=center style="border-style: none none solid solid; background: #e3e3e3"|Alternate Name/s
|align=center style="border-style: none none solid solid; background: #e3e3e3"|Location
|align=center style="border-style: none none solid solid; background: #e3e3e3"|Attendance
|align=center style="border-style: none none solid solid; background: #e3e3e3"|PPV Buyrate
|align=center style="border-style: none none solid solid; background: #e3e3e3"|Notes
|-align=center
|January 11
|UFC 35: Throwdown
|
| Uncasville, Connecticut, United States
|9,600
|35,000
|
|-align=center
|February 22
|Pride The Best Vol. 1
|
| Tokyo, Japan
|
|
|
|-align=center
|February 24
|Pride 19: Bad Blood
|
| Saitama, Japan
|
|
|
|-align=center
|March 22
|UFC 36: Worlds Collide
|
| Las Vegas, United States
|10,000
|55,000
|
|-align=center
|April 28
|Pride 20: Armed and Ready
|
| Yokohama, Japan
|
|
|
|-align=center
|May 10
|UFC 37: High Impact
|
| Bossier City, Louisiana, United States
|7,200
|50,000
|
|-align=center
|June 22
|UFC 37.5: As Real As It Gets
|
| Las Vegas, United States
|3,700
|
|
|-align=center
|June 23
|Pride 21: Demolition
|
| Saitama, Japan
|
|
|
|-align=center
|July 13
|UFC 38: Brawl at the Hall
|
| Saitama, Japan
|3,800
|45,000
|
|-align=center
|July 20
|Pride The Best Vol. 2
|
| Tokyo, Japan
|
|
|
|-align=center
|August 28
|Pride Shockwave
|Dynamite!
| Tokyo, Japan
|91,108
|
|
|-align=center
|September 27
|UFC 39: The Warriors Return
|
| Uncasville, Connecticut, United States
|7,800
|45,000
|
|-align=center
|September 29
|Pride 22: Beasts From The East 2
|
| Nagoya, Japan
|
|
|
|-align=center
|November 22
|UFC 40: Vendetta
|
| Las Vegas, United States
|13,265
|150,000
|
|-align=center
|November 24
|Pride 23: Championship Chaos 2
|
| Tokyo, Japan
|
|
|
|-align=center
|December 23
|Pride 24: Cold Fury 3
|
| Fukuoka, Japan
|
|
|
|-align=center

Motorsport

Orienteering
 First Mountain Bike Orienteering World Championships are held July 2–7 in Fontainebleau, France.

Radiosport
 The fourth World Radiosport Team Championship held in Helsinki, Finland.  Gold medals go to Jeff Steinman N5TJ and Dan Street K1TO of the United States, the team's third victory in a row.
 Eleventh Amateur Radio Direction Finding World Championship held in Tatranske Matliare, Slovakia.

Rugby league
The Australian Rugby League Hall of Fame is established.
2002 New Zealand rugby league tour 
2002 New Zealand rugby league tour of Great Britain and France
2002 NRL season
2002 NRL grand final
2002 State of Origin series
Super League VII
2002 Super League Grand Final
2002 World Club Challenge

Rugby union
 108th Six Nations Championship series is won by France who complete the Grand Slam
 Tri Nations – New Zealand
 Heineken Cup – Leicester Tigers 15–9 Munster

Ski mountaineering
 Inaugural World Championship of Skimountaineering sanctioned by the International Council for Ski Mountaineering Competitions (ICSM) was held in Serre Chevalier in France from January 24 to January 27.

Snooker
 World Snooker Championship – Peter Ebdon beats Stephen Hendry 18-17
 World rankings – Ronnie O'Sullivan becomes world number one for 2002–03

Swimming
 26 January – in Berlin, Slovakian swimmer Martina Moravcová betters Jenny Thompson's world record in the women's 100m butterfly (short course) from 56:56 to 56:55
 April – 6th World Short Course Championships held at Moscow
 United States wins the most medals (26) Australia the most gold medals (10)
 July–August – 26th European LC Championships held at Berlin
 Germany wins the most medals (23) and the most gold medals (10)
 August – 9th Pan Pacific Championships held at Yokohama
 United States wins the most medals (52) and the most gold medals (21)
 22 November – US swimmer Natalie Coughlin betters Martina Moravcová's world record in the women's 100m butterfly (short course) from 56:55 to 56:39
 December – 6th European SC Championships held at Riesa, Germany
 Germany wins the most medals (22) and the most gold medals (7)

Tennis
See also 2002 ATP Tour, 2002 WTA Tour
 Grand Slam in tennis men's results:
 Australian Open – Thomas Johansson
 French Open – Albert Costa
 Wimbledon championships – Lleyton Hewitt
 U.S. Open – Pete Sampras
 Grand Slam in tennis women's results:
 Australian Open – Jennifer Capriati
 French Open – Serena Williams
 Wimbledon championships – Serena Williams
 U.S. Open – Serena Williams
 Davis Cup – in the final, Russia defeats France 3–2 at the Palais Omnisports de Paris-Bercy in Paris
 Fed Cup – Slovakia defeats Spain 3–1 in the final at Palacio de Congresos de Maspalomas in Gran Canaria, Spain

Volleyball
 2002 FIVB Men's World Championship: Brazil
 2002 FIVB Women's World Championship: Italy
 2002 Men's World League: Russia
 2002 Women's World Grand Prix: Russia
 Men's volleyball at the 2002 Asian Games: South Korea
 Women's volleyball at the 2002 Asian Games: China

Water polo
 2002 FINA Men's Water Polo World Cup: Russia
 2002 FINA Men's Water Polo World League: Russia
 2002 FINA Women's Water Polo World Cup: Hungary

Winter Olympics
 2002 Winter Olympics takes place in Salt Lake City, United States
 Norway wins the most medals (25) and the most gold medals (13)
 Top performers include Janica Kostelić, Ole Einar Bjørndalen and Simon Ammann
 A scandal in figure skating dominates the news.
 Also on the short track, Steven Bradbury of Australia becomes the first Winter Olympic gold medalist from the Southern Hemisphere when a crash on the final corner of the men's 1000 m final leaves him the "last man standing".

Multi-sport events
 2002 Commonwealth Games held in Manchester, England
 2002 Asian Games held in Busan, South Korea
 2002 Gay Games held in Sydney, Australia
 2002 South American Games held in Sao Paulo, Brazil
 2002 Central American and Caribbean Games held in San Salvador, El Salvador

Awards
 Associated Press Male Athlete of the Year – Lance Armstrong, Cycling
 Associated Press Female Athlete of the Year – Serena Williams, Tennis

References

 
Sports by year